A missionary is someone who travels to a region to work as part of a religious group.

Missionary may also refer to:

People
 Mormon missionary, a missionary for The Church of Jesus Christ of Latter-day Saints
 The American "missionary generation", born between 1860 and 1882

Film and television
 The Missionary, a 1982 comedy film starring Michael Palin
 Missionary (film), a 2013 horror-thriller film by Anthony DiBlasi
 The Missionary, a 2013 television film directed by Baltasar Kormákur
 The Missionaries, a 2014 French romantic comedy film

Other
 The missionary position, a sex position
 The Missionary Position: Mother Teresa in Theory and Practice, a biography of Mother Teresa by Christopher Hitchens 
 Misionarul (The Missionary), a Romanian-language newspaper
 Missionary, an upcoming studio album by Snoop Dogg

See also
 
 
 Mission (disambiguation)
 Missionary Man (disambiguation)
 Hawaiian Missionaries (stamps)